This is the discography of rapper and producer Sam the Kid.

Albums

Singles

Production credits

Collaborations and guest appearances

Sources
https://web.archive.org/web/20070501084718/http://www.h2tuga.net/mcdj/grupos_s/samthekid.php

Discography
Hip hop discographies
Discographies of Portuguese artists